Broadway Broke is a 1923 American silent drama film directed by J. Searle Dawley and starring Mary Carr, Percy Marmont, and Gladys Leslie. A struggling former Broadway actress tries to restart her career by turning to playwriting.

Cast

References

Bibliography
 Munden, Kenneth White. The American Film Institute Catalog of Motion Pictures Produced in the United States, Part 1. University of California Press, 1997.

External links

 

1923 films
1923 drama films
1920s English-language films
American silent feature films
Silent American drama films
American black-and-white films
Films directed by J. Searle Dawley
Selznick Pictures films
1920s American films